Anna Chakvetadze was the defending champion, but chose not to participate that year.

Eleni Daniilidou won with a walkover, after Vera Zvonareva withdrew from the final due to a left ankle injury.

Seeds

  Alyona Bondarenko (second round)
  Vera Zvonareva (final, withdrew to a left ankle injury)
  Maria Kirilenko (withdrew due to a left knee injury)
  Agnieszka Radwańska (first round)
  Victoria Azarenka (first round, retired due to a right abductor injury)
  Sania Mirza (quarterfinals)
  Julia Vakulenko (withdrew due to a wrist injury)
  Anabel Medina Garrigues (first round, retired due to a lower back injury)
  Gisela Dulko (first round, retired due to a left hip injury)

Draw

Finals

Top half

Bottom half

External links
Draw and Qualifying Draw

Singles
Moorilla Hobart International